Rialto Records was a record label based in Chicago, Illinois in the 1920s. It was owned by the Rialto Music House (330 S State St), sold at their stores at promotional prices. The records themselves were pressed by Marsh Recording Laboratories (Suite 625 Kimball Building, 306 South Wabash Avenue, Chicago, Illinois).

The most famous record they produced was the only release known of Jelly Roll Morton's unaccompanied recording of "London Blues," made in 1924.

Notes

References

Defunct record labels of the United States
1920s establishments in Illinois
Companies established in the 1920s
Companies with year of disestablishment missing
Jazz record labels
Defunct companies based in Chicago
Record labels